Alysia is a luxury charter Motor yacht owned by Greek businessman Andreas Liveras. She was constructed in steel during 2006 by the Neorion ship-yard for a cost of about 116 million EUR. This made her Forbes magazine's most expensive yacht in the world for 2006.

Statistics 
She can accommodate up to 36 guests and 36 crew. The main engines are twin Caterpillar 3606s, with maximum output of  each. Her auxiliary diesel generators are three 500 kW Caterpillar 3412s and one Caterpillar 3406. Her propulsion system drives two variable pitch KaMeWa propellers.
It was on sale for 85M euro.

Renovated and renamed Moonlight II in 2012, and offered for weekly rentals of 500,000 euro.

Accommodation 
Alysia has a large jacuzzi, two outside bars, water jets, diving equipment, fishing equipment and a 
small speed boat used for dives away from the yacht. The staterooms include a small cinema, large conference room and small restaurant.

Moonlight II
The yacht was renamed Moonlight II in 2010.

References

External links
Photo
Alysia, Viliyana Filipova

2006 ships
Motor yachts